Emlin McClain (November 26, 1851 – May 25, 1915) was a justice of the Iowa Supreme Court from January 1, 1901, to December 31, 1912, appointed from Johnson County, Iowa.

References

Justices of the Iowa Supreme Court
1851 births
1915 deaths
19th-century American judges